Carolina Rossini is a Brazilian-American attorney who focuses on intellectual property, open standard, and data privacy. She is notable for her work in intellectual property law in her native Brazil. In 2016, she was selected as a Young Global Leader by the World Economic Forum.

Biography
Rossini was born in São Paulo, Brazil. She speaks and writes English, Spanish and her native Portuguese.

Rossini holds a LL.M in Intellectual Property from Boston University, and degrees from the Sao Paulo State University-UNESP (Master in International Negotiations), University of Sao Paulo (Bachelor in Law), Instituto de Empresa-IE (MBA in E-Business).

She is married to John Wilbanks.

Career
Since 2000, Rossini has been a prominent figure within the development of ICT. On April 2, 2014, Rossini was called to the United States House of Representatives to discuss the proposed transfer of the IANA stewardship from the United States.

Rossini also played an important role in the Marco Civil legislation passed in 2014 in her native Brazil, as she was the key translator of the approved law from Portuguese to English.

An attorney by trade, Rossini has held various positions with leading technology companies and think tanks such as: Facebook, New America, Public Knowledge, and the Electronic Frontier Foundation.

Bibliography

References

Rossini in the media
  Hollywood Lobbyist Hasn't Seen The TPP Text, Cannot Read The TPP Text, But Knows What's In The TPP Text?
  What is the Trans-Pacific Partnership and why are Critics Upset by it?
  US Congressional Push For Release Of TPP Text; US Pressuring Nations Bilaterally?

Year of birth missing (living people)
Living people
American women lawyers
Boston University School of Law alumni
American people of Brazilian descent
IE University
Intellectual property activism
Internet activists
São Paulo State University alumni
University of São Paulo alumni
21st-century American women